Llwyncelyn is a district of Porth, Rhondda Cynon Taf.

Consisting of five long terraces and two modern housing developments, Llwyncelyn has one shop and a parish church, St. Luke's Church.

Llwyncelyn is also where Porth Harlequins RFC play their home rugby union matches.

Nearby Nyth-Brân Farm was the home of athlete Guto Nyth Brân.

External links
St. Luke's Church

Villages in Rhondda Cynon Taf